Chimia Râmnicu Vâlcea was a football club based in Râmnicu Vâlcea, Vâlcea County, Romania. It was founded in 1946 and dissolved in 2004. It won one Romanian Cup, in 1973.

History

In 1946 Vâlceana appeared in the Third Division. In 1947 it changed its name to CSM Vâlcea. The club is relegated and only in 1956 succeeds to return again under the name of Flamura Roşie, the name being changed the next year to Unirea and in 1958 to Şantierul Govora. It is relegated again, but after one year, the team jumped directly to the Second Division under the name of Chimia Govora.

In 1962 the club changed its name again, this time to Unirea Râmnicu Vâlcea, in 1966 to Oltul and in 1967 to Chimia Râmnicu Vâlcea. Since 1960 the squad participated at 10 editions of Liga II, finishing in the top half. One season in Liga III followed, but the team managed to be promoted to the Liga II again.

Its greatest performance came at the end of the 1972–1973 season, when the team won the Romanian Cup as a Divizia B team after a double match in "The final of the poor" against Divizia C team Constructorul Galați, (1–1, 3–0). The team was coached by Dumitru Anescu: Stana – Burlacu, T. Ciobanu, Pintilie, Petrică – I. Haidu, I. Ionescu – Şutru (Orovitz), Donose, Gojgaru (H. Popescu), V. Iordache (Tifirel).

The following season, the club  (N. Dinescu Chairman, coaches: Gh. Nuţescu – D. Anescu) was promoted to the First Division. Players (that recently appeared): I. Crăciunescu (the famous referee), Lepădatu, Enache, Borz, Cincă, C. Nicolae, Păunescu, Emil Dumitriu, Peniu. In the autumn of 1973 the team played in the first round of the Cup Winners Cup against Glentoran Belfast, but was eliminated. After two seasons of top football the club is relegated to the Second Division, but manages to come back after three years. Coach Marcel Pigulea was 'to blame' for this performance. The club succeeds to play for nine consecutive years on the first level of Romanian football, and a great merit goes to Teodor Coman, a great football fanatic, one of the few good people in command of the former PCR. Valuable players that played during this period: Gh. Constantin, V. Roşca, N. Pavel – Başno, Iordan, Cincă, Lepădatu, Catargiu, Cheran, Fl. Udrea, Cireașă – Carabageac, Savu, Gab. Stan, Mih. Alexandru, Vergu, C. Iovan – Ad. Coca, Gîngiu, Stanca, Teleşpan, M. Preda, Buduru, Verigeanu.

In 1987, the club is relegated to the Second Division, and after 10 years, in 1996 to the Third Division. In 1994, it changes its name to FC Râmnicu Vâlcea. In 1998 a new relegation comes, this time to the County Championship (Fourth League).

In 2004 the club is dissolved after serious financial problems.

Honours

Liga I:
Winners (0):, Best finish: 8th 1981–82

Liga II:
Winners (2): 1973–74, 1977–78
Runners-up (2): 1988–89, 1990–91

Liga III:
Winners (1): 1970–71
Runners-up (2): 1956, 1957–58

Cupa României:
Winners (1): 1972–73

Chimia Râmnicu Vâlcea in Europe

European Cup Winners' Cup

Chimia Râmnicu Vâlcea in Divizia A

References

Association football clubs established in 1946
Association football clubs disestablished in 2004
Defunct football clubs in Romania
Football clubs in Vâlcea County
Liga I clubs
Râmnicu Vâlcea
1946 establishments in Romania
2004 disestablishments in Romania